Peter Roy better known as Peter Peter (born c. 1984) is a Canadian singer-songwriter known for his French pop/rock compositions.

Career
He started as a member of metal/alternative rock band Post-Scriptum where he played guitar and English vocals at times. After leaving the band, he moved to Montreal and resided in the Hochelaga-Maisonneuve neighborhood, concentrating on his solo career writing and performing in French. He took part as a singer-songwriter in the annual Montreal feature Ma Première Place des Arts for new artists in 2008 and won the competition.

In 2009 he signed with Audiogram record label, releasing his eponymous debut album Peter Peter on 8 March 2011 produced by Howard Bilerman. In 2011, he also took part in Les FrancoFolies de Montréal.

In June 2013, his studio album Une version améliorée de la tristesse ("An Improved Version of Sadness") was longlisted for the 2013 Polaris Music Prize.

Discography

Albums

Singles / videography

References

External links

Canadian singer-songwriters
1984 births
Living people
Musicians from Quebec City
21st-century Canadian male singers
Canadian male singer-songwriters